Post-Communist Economies is a quarterly peer-reviewed academic journal covering economics in post-communist countries. It was established in 1989 as Communist Economies and renamed as Communist Economies and Economic Transformation in 1991, before obtaining its current name in 1999. It covers economic institutions, policies, and performance of ex-communist countries. The geographic focus of the journal is mainly on European post-communist economies, including countries of the former Soviet Union, but papers on Mongolia, China, and Vietnam are also published.

Abstracting and indexing
The journal is abstracted and indexed in:
Current Contents/Behavioral Sciences
Sage Human Resources Abstracts
Sage Public Administration Abstracts
Scopus
Social Sciences Citation Index
According to the Journal Citation Reports, the journal has a 2014 impact factor of 0.492.

References

External links

Economics journals
Publications established in 1989
Taylor & Francis academic journals
Quarterly journals
English-language journals